Hardy Williams Academy, formerly the Anna Howard Shaw Junior High School is a historic junior high school building located in the Southwest Schuylkill neighborhood of Philadelphia, Pennsylvania. The building was designed by Irwin T. Catharine and built in 1922–1924. It is a three-story, 17 bay, brick building on a raised stone basement in the Colonial Revival-style. It is in the shape of a shallow "W". It features a center projecting pavilion, stone cornice, and a brick parapet. The school was named for Anna Howard Shaw.

It was added to the National Register of Historic Places in 1988. Since 2015, the school has been used as a charter school run by Mastery Charter Schools. It was renamed in honor of Hardy Williams.

References

External links

School buildings on the National Register of Historic Places in Philadelphia
Colonial Revival architecture in Pennsylvania
School buildings completed in 1924
Charter schools in Pennsylvania
Southwest Philadelphia
1924 establishments in Pennsylvania